James Gang Rides Again (alternatively known as simply Rides Again) is the second studio album by American rock band James Gang. The album was released on the label ABC Records. It is the James Gang's first album to feature bassist Dale Peters.

Critical reception

Writing for AllMusic, critic Stephen Thomas Erlewine wrote of the album "With their second album Rides Again, the James Gang came into their own... Walsh's songwriting had improved, giving the band solid support for their stylistic experiments. What ties the two sides of the record together is the strength of the band's musicianship, which burns brightly and powerfully on the hardest rockers, as well as on the sensitive ballads." Music critic John Swenson named it "one of the most important rock records of the Seventies."

Track listing

On the initial pressings of James Gang Rides Again, a 1:25 electric rendition of Maurice Ravel's "Boléro" is interpolated into the song "The Bomber." Ravel's estate threatened suit against both the James Gang and ABC Records for its unauthorized use. As a result, the track was edited, and the "Boléro" section was removed on most subsequent pressings of the album. The edited song's running time on such pressings is 5:39. Some late 1970s LP pressings included "Boléro" by mistake, and the most recent CD re-issue of Rides Again contains the full version of "The Bomber," with the "Boléro" section restored.

Personnel
James Gang
Joe Walsh – electric and acoustic guitars, keyboards, vocals, liner notes
Dale Peters – bass guitar, 12 string acoustic guitar ("Ashes the Rain and I")
Jim Fox – drums, percussion
Additional
 Rusty Young – pedal steel guitar ("There I Go Again")

Production
Bill Szymczyk – production, engineer, remastering
Mike D. Stone - engineer
Ted Jensen – remastering
Dale Peters – liner notes
Jim Fox – liner notes
Tom Wright – photography

References 

James Gang albums
1970 albums
ABC Records albums
Albums produced by Bill Szymczyk
Albums recorded at Record Plant (New York City)